Kim Cooper may refer to:

Kim Cooper (softball) (born 1965), Australian softball player
Kim Cooper (singer), contestant on Australian Idol